Orville Inman "Coot" Veal (July 9, 1932 – March 14, 2021) was an American professional baseball shortstop. He was signed by the Detroit Tigers before the  season and played in all or portions of six seasons in Major League Baseball (MLB) for the Tigers (1958–1960; 1963), Washington Senators (1961), and Pittsburgh Pirates (1962).

Veal attended Auburn University, where he played baseball and basketball. Selected in the 1960 American League expansion draft, he was the first player to come to bat in the history of the second modern (1961–71) Washington Senators franchise, now the Texas Rangers. On April 10, 1961, at Griffith Stadium, with President John F. Kennedy having thrown out the first ball, Veal led off the bottom of the first inning against Hall of Fame right-hander Early Wynn of the Chicago White Sox. He reached base on an infield single near third base, was advanced to second on a Marty Keough single to left, then scored (along with Keough) on a Gene Woodling triple.

Veal was a very good defensive shortstop (.976), but his bat was somewhat weak. He had a lifetime average of .231, with 141 hits, 26 doubles, three triples, one home run in 611 total at bats and a slugging percentage of .288. He scored 75 runs and drove in 51 in his 247 big-league games.  His last year as an active player was 1964.

Veal was inducted into the Macon, Georgia, Sports Hall of Fame in 2001.

Death
Veal died on March 14, 2021, at the age of 88.

References

External links

1932 births
2021 deaths
American men's basketball players
Auburn Tigers baseball players
Auburn Tigers men's basketball players
Augusta Tigers players
Baseball players from Georgia (U.S. state)
Birmingham Barons players
Buffalo Bisons (minor league) players
Charleston Senators players
Columbus Jets players
Detroit Tigers players
Denver Bears players
Durham Bulls players
Indianapolis Indians players
Jacksonville Suns players
Jamestown Falcons players
Major League Baseball shortstops
Montgomery Grays players
People from Sandersville, Georgia
Pittsburgh Pirates players
Syracuse Chiefs players
Washington Senators (1961–1971) players
Wilkes-Barre Barons (baseball) players
Williamsport Tigers players